Réno-Dépôt (known as Reno-Depot outside of Quebec) is a Canadian chain of home supply stores owned by Rona, Inc.. Primarily operating in Quebec, Réno-Dépôt is a warehouse-styled format with a focus on discounted renovation and household hardware products. The chain briefly expanded into Ontario under the name The Building Box; following Rona's acquisition of Réno-Dépôt, these stores were re-branded as Rona Home & Garden locations.

History

In 1987, Groupe Val Royal entered into a strategic agreement with the Molson Companies and acquired the Castor Bricoleur stores, located in Québec. These stores became Brico Centres. In 1992, Groupe Val Royal, with its partner Aikenhead's, a division of the Molson Companies, announced the creation of Réno-Dépôt warehouse stores.  The first location opened in Brossard. After the Brossard store, Montréal welcomed its first branch location in August 1993, in Anjou. In 1994, two other stores opened their doors: Laval and Pointe-Claire, followed by Marché Central (Montréal) and Québec in 1995. That same year, the company changed its name to Réno-Dépôt. In 1996, a new location was established in Saint-Hubert.

In 1997, the two majority shareholders of Réno-Dépôt Inc., the Michaud family and Molson Companies Limited, sold their interest in the company to the French group Castorama. In 1998, the British group Kingfisher plc acquired a large block of shares from Castorama to become the majority shareholder. In 1999, Réno-Dépôt opened a location in LaSalle and, the following year, entered the Ontario market under the English-language banner The Building Box.

In 2003, Rona Inc. acquired Réno-Dépôt; following the merger, the Ontario-based Building Box stores were re-branded as Rona Home & Garden. The purchase was part of a plan to establish more "big box" stores to accompany its smaller specialty outlets and compete with the U.S.-based chain The Home Depot.

In 2013, in the wake of cuts across the company, the Réno-Dépôt chain was re-positioned as a discount wholesale-focused banner with a reduced product selection. In 2015, Rona announced that the brand would expand outside of Quebec with the re-opening of shuttered Rona locations in Calgary and Aurora, Ontario as Reno-Depot.

References

External links
 

Lowe's
Hardware stores of Canada
Canadian brands
Retail companies established in 1993
Companies based in Boucherville
1993 establishments in Quebec